Abdurahman Waleed (Arabic:عبد الرحمن وليد) (born 25 March 1994) is a Qatari footballer who plays for Al-Shamal as a midfielder.

External links

References

Qatari footballers
1994 births
Living people
Qatar Stars League players
Qatari Second Division players
El Jaish SC players
Umm Salal SC players
Muaither SC players
Al-Arabi SC (Qatar) players
Al-Shamal SC players
Association football midfielders